A Tourist Guide To Lancre is the third book in the Discworld Mapp series, and the first to be illustrated by Paul Kidby. As with the other maps, the basic design and booklet were compiled by Terry Pratchett and Stephen Briggs.

The Mapp shows the mountain country of Lancre, with the Ramtops drawn in a vertigo-inducing perspective shot, rather than as a relief diagram. The accompanying booklet details the history, geography and folklore of the country, with contributions from both Gytha Ogg (anticipating the style of Nanny Ogg's Cookbook) and Eric Wheelbrace, the Discworld's most famous hillwalker (a parody of Alfred Wainwright).

External links
 

Discworld books
Fictional atlases
Fictional maps
Discworld locations
Corgi books
1998 books